Šišići is a village in the municipality of Trnovo, Bosnia and Herzegovina.

Demographics 
According to the 2013 census, its population was just 1, a Serb.

References

Populated places in Trnovo, Sarajevo